The Ivory Coast women's national handball team is the national team of Ivory Coast. It is takes part in international handball competitions.

The team participated in the 2009 World Women's Handball Championship in China, finishing 18th. In 2011 they finished 16th.

Results

Summer Olympics
1988 – 8th

World Championship
1995 – 17–20th
1997 – 14th
1999 – 20th
2003 – 21st
2005 – 21st
2009 – 18th
2011 – 16th

African Championship
1976 – 6th
1979 – 4th
1981 – 4th
1983 – 4th
1985 – 2nd
1987 – 1st
1989 – 2nd
1991 – 6th
1992 – 3rd
1994 – 2nd
1996 – 1st
1998 – 3rd
2000 – 5th
2002 – 2nd
2004 – 3rd
2006 – 4th
2008 – 2nd
2010 – 3rd
2012 – 7th
2016 – 5th
2018 – 9th
2022 – 7th

External links
IHF profile

Women's national handball teams
H
Women's handball in Ivory Coast